People and Masks Part 2 is a 1913 German silent film directed by Harry Piel and featuring Hedda Vernon and Ludwig Trautmann in the lead roles.

Cast 
Hedda Vernon
Ludwig Trautmann

External links 

German silent short films
German black-and-white films
Films directed by Harry Piel
Films of the German Empire
1910s German films